Aigerim Tazhi (Айгерим Тажи, born 1981) is a Kazakhstani poet. Tazhi's poetry has been published in world literary magazines and translated into various languages. Tazhi is the author of the poetry collection БОГ-О-СЛОВ (THEO-LOG-IAN) (Kazakhstan, Musagetes, 2004) and the bilingual poetry book Бумажная кожа/Paper-Thin Skin (USA, Zephyr Press, 2019, English translation by J.Kates), which was released after winning a Fellowship from the National Endowment for the Arts. According to reviews of her poetry, critics noted "Tazhi’s poems have been widely praised as a fresh new voice and for blazing a new direction among the youngest generation of Kazakh poets" and "In Aigerim Tazhi’s poetry, we may find the marvelous that drew us to poetry to begin with".

Life and career 
Aigerim Tazhi was born in the western Kazakhstani city of Aktobe (formerly called Aktyubinsk) in 1981. She is a graduate of the Aktyubinsk (Zhubanov) State University.

Her debut book of poetry, БОГ-О-СЛОВ (THEO-LOG-IAN, which could also be read as GOD O' WORDS), was published in 2004. Tazhi's work has been featured in Russian literary magazines and anthologies, including Novy Mir, Znamya, Druzhba Narodov, Vozdukh, Novaya Yunost and others.

Tazhi was also one of the creators of a project of literary installations The Visible Poetry.

Tazhi's poems have been translated into various languages, including English, French, Dutch, Polish, Armenian, Uzbek, and others, and published in literary magazines and anthologies in multiple countries. Her poems have been translated into English by American poet and literary translator J.Kates and appeared in American and UK literary journals, including The Kenyon Review, The Massachusetts Review, Prairie Schooner, Atlanta Review, Colorado Review, Stand, St. Petersburg Review, Two Lines, Words Without Borders, The Common, etc. 

Tazhi's second book of poetry, Бумажная кожа/Paper-Thin Skin (Zephyr Press, USA) was published as a bilingual English-Russian volume in 2019. The book received numerous positive reviews from American, European, Russian, and Kazakhstani critics.

Aigerim Tazhi lives in Almaty, Kazakhstan.

Critical reception 

Elmira Elvazova writes in The Massachusetts Review, "Tazhi’s poetry is one of a reversal of roles, a depersonalized narrative, built from a heightened observational sense and attunement to the outer world that dramatizes the inner landscape, where phenomenal imagery accrues, where roles, sensations, and images are always changing, metamorphosing, as the angle of the sun shifts. [...] For a debut poetry collection, Aigerim Tazhi’s Paper-Thin Skin is a work of stunning originality."

Alison Mandaville of World Literature Today writes, "Tazhi’s poetry is a music that explores our shared borders as spaces of opportunity, for the possibility of creating “an imagined world: one that absorbs music from the outside, / and will not preserve the borders / of an internal country."

Aleksey Alekhin of Arion writes, "Aigerim Tazhi’s poetic thinking is laconic, but in a few lines of rhyming or free verse she manages to fit a considerable world. Distinguished at first by sharply noticed material detail, sketching, gesture, this world is turned back to the reader with its own psychological and even metaphysical essence."

Galina Klimova of Druzhba Narodov writes, "Conversation, prayer, meditation + a fulcrum – sometimes in rhyme, sometimes with assonance. But what is stronger and more dependable is her rhythm. In her poems there is a great deal of room for all the details of time, places and events which are explained simply and confidently without forced pathos and ambiguous innuendoes."

Timothy Walsh of Rain Taxi Review writes, "Tazhi’s poems are strikingly imagistic, her syntax shorn of unnecessary appendages. By steering clear of any narrative thread or conceptual utterance, they seem like pure instants of perception."

Honors and awards
Tazhi has received multiple literary prizes in Kazakhstan and Russia. She won the International Literary Steps Prize in poetry (Moscow, 2003). In 2011, she was a finalist for the Russian Debut Prize (Moscow) in Poetry. In 2016, Tazhi's poetry, translated by Kates, was awarded a National Endowment for the Arts (NEA) Fellowship.

In 2019, Tazhi was included in the prize list of the International Literary Poetry Prize (Moscow). Later that year, Tazhi became a finalist of the International Literary Voloshin Contest (Moscow). Her book Paper-Thin Skin was awarded The Käpylä Translation Prize, and World Literature Today included the book to the list of the Most Notable Translations of 2019''.

Interviews
Sometimes One Drop is Enough to Change the Whole Ocean: Aigerim Tazhi. Interview by Philip Metres. Dispatches from the Poetry Wars, 2014
American Publisher to Release Collection of Poems by Kazakh Poet Aigerim Tazhi. The Astana Times, 2016
A cure for the modern world: Aigerim Tazhi. Interview by Vassilina Atoyanz. Forbes Kazakhstan, 2014

References 

1981 births
Living people
Kazakhstani poets
Kazakhstani writers
21st-century Kazakhstani writers
Kazakhstani women writers
Kazakhstani women poets